The finals and the qualifying heats of the Women's 800 metres Freestyle event at the 1993 FINA Short Course World Championships were held in Palma de Mallorca, Spain.

Results

See also
1992 Women's Olympic Games 800m Freestyle
1993 Women's European LC Championships 800m Freestyle

References
 swimrankings

F
1993 in women's swimming